Saros cycle series 124 for lunar eclipses occurs at the moon's ascending node, 18 years 11 and 1/3 days. It contains 73 member events, with 28 total eclipses, starting in 1657 and ending in 2144. The order is 20 penumbral, 8 partial, 28 total, 8 partial, 9 penumbral.

This lunar saros is linked to Solar Saros 131.

See also 
 List of lunar eclipses
 List of Saros series for lunar eclipses

Notes

External links 
 www.hermit.org: Saros 124

Lunar saros series